In shogi, Right King or Right-hand King (右玉 migi gyoku) is a defensive subcomponent of different openings in which the king stays on the right side of the board together with the rook, which protects the back rank (rank 9) as well as the eighth file. It is an exception to the general rule that the king is castled away from the rook.

It is possible to use a Right King formation within a Bishop Exchange opening as well as other openings.

The castle formation used in these strategies is also called a Right King castle.

Overview 

When an opponent is building up a Static Rook position, castling the king to the left means that the player will need to defend from attacks from above. However, were the king to be placed in the right, far away from the opponent's attack, the efficacy of such an attack could be diminished. As for variations in right king, in the case where a castle has been built on the left flank, the opponent will expect that the king will transfer to the left as well, and hence will start many attacks toward there. Hence, playing right king can be said to be an effective move to counter this assumption. While it may appear at first glance to contradict the maxim of "Don't place the king and the rook close to each other," insofar as there are no gaps where the opponent can drop pieces and it's possible to attack, it can be said that Right King has good balance. For example, if an opponent has attacked from the left flank, by way of P-4e, P-2d, the player can launch a counterattack aimed at the king's head with rook, bishop and knight. In some circumstances the rook can range in preparation for attacks from the left flank. 

Yoshiharu Habu adopted this strategy in his seventh game in the title match of the Ōi tournament, playing white (gote), in September 12 and 13, 2016. Although Habu had initially moved his king leftwards to the 42 square earlier in the game, he later moved his king rightwards (K-52, K-61, K-72) to form a Right King position. Additionally, his left silver that was earlier on the 33 square has moved after a pawn trade on the fourth file to the 53 square (via S-44) further strengthening the Right King castle.

On the other hand, there are countermeasures for Right King, among the most notorious of which are Feint Ranging Rook and Subway Rook, or Chikara Akutsu's switching from a Floating Chrysanthemum Fortress to a Silver Crown.

Against Ranging Rook

Itodani's Right King 
It was developed by Tetsurō Itodani. It can be used against Ranging Rook openings (especially against Cheerful Central Rook). The king itself defends the center, while the rook uses the left side to attack on Ranging Rook's king's head.

See also

 Bishop Exchange
 Castle (shogi)

References

Bibliography

 阿久津主税 必ず役立つプロの常識 （2009年12月、毎日コミュニケーションズ、）
 塚田泰明監修、横田稔著『序盤戦! 囲いと攻めの形』、高橋書店、1997年
 豊川孝弘著、『パワーアップ戦法塾』NHK出版、2002年、

External links

 Shogi Planet: Itodani's Migi-Gyoku

Shogi openings